The 13th Annual Tony Awards took place at the Waldorf-Astoria Grand Ballroom on April 12, 1959, and was broadcast on local television station WCBS-TV in New York City. The Master of Ceremonies was Bud Collyer.

The ceremony
Presenters: Dana Andrews, Ina Balin, Ralph Bellamy, Polly Bergen, Claudette Colbert, Robert Dowling, Faye Emerson, Farley Granger, Oscar Hammerstein II, Celeste Holm, Robert Preston, and Rip Torn. Music was by Meyer Davis and his Orchestra.

Winners and nominees
Source:InfoPlease

Winners are in bold

Special awards
John Gielgud, for contribution to theatre for his extraordinary insight into the writings of Shakespeare as demonstrated in his one-man play, Ages of Man.
Howard Lindsay and Russel Crouse, for a collaboration that lasted longer than Gilbert and Sullivan.
Cast of La Plume de Ma Tante: Pamela Austin, Colette Brosset, Roger Caccia, Yvonne Constant, Genevieve Coulombel, Robert Dhéry, Michael Kent, Jean Lefevre, Jacques Legras, Michael Modo, Pierre Olaf, Nicole Parent, Ross Parker, Henri Pennec, for contribution to the theatre.

Multiple nominations and awards

These productions had multiple nominations:

7 nominations: Redhead
6 nominations: Flower Drum Song 
5 nominations: Goldilocks, J.B. and The Visit   
4 nominations: La Plume de Ma Tante, A Majority of One and The Pleasure of His Company 
3 nominations: The Disenchanted, Epitaph for George Dillon and Rashomon
2 nominations: The Marriage-Go-Round, A Touch of the Poet and Whoop-Up  

The following productions received multiple awards.

6 wins: Redhead 
2 wins: Goldilocks, J.B. and A Majority of One

References

External links
 Tony Awards Official Site

Tony Awards ceremonies
1959 in theatre
1959 awards
1959 in the United States
1959 in New York City
1959 awards in the United States
April 1959 events in the United States